The Syrian Nonviolence Movement is a non-governmental organization formed in 2011 by a group of Syrian activists. They believe in peaceful struggle and civil resistance as a way to achieve social, cultural and political change in the Syrian state and society.

The organization aims to spread awareness about how change should happen in society with no violence and through non-violence tactics.

Projects

Dignity Strike
Syrian Nonviolence Movement has conducted several grassroots initiatives since the beginning of the Syrian revolution, such as karamah Strike (known as "Dignity Strike in Syria")

Freedom Days
The group gathered other non-violence groups under an umbrella called "Freedom Days" which organized and planned many non-violent activities and projects during the Syrian Revolution

Non-violence Map
The Syrian Nonviolence Movement produced a map of nonviolence activities during the Syrian Civil War. The interactive map visualizes many civil initiatives that emerged during the civil war

References

Nonviolence organizations
Nonviolent resistance movements
Organizations of the Syrian civil war
Movements for civil rights